Ecsenius dilemma, the twocoat coralblenny, is a species of combtooth blenny in the genus Ecsenius. It is found in coral reefs in the western Pacific ocean, specifically in the Philippines. It can reach a maximum length of 3.1 centimetres. Blennies in this species feed primarily off of benthic algae and weeds, and are commercial aquarium fish.

References

dilemma
Fish described in 1988
Taxa named by Victor G. Springer